Malcolm Nathan Shaw KC (born 1947) is a British legal  academic, author, editor and lawyer. He is highly regarded as one of the worlds most accomplished and proficient academic in international law.

Early life
Shaw studied at the University of Liverpool (LLB), the Hebrew University of Jerusalem (LLM) and Keele University (PhD).

Career
Shaw was the Sir Robert Jennings Professor of International Law at the University of Leicester and taught international law, human rights and equity and trusts. Following retirement, he was appointed as Senior Fellow at the Lauterpacht Centre for International Law at the University of Cambridge and made a Trustee of the British Institute of International and Comparative Law. He is a practising barrister and jurist.

He is the author of a best selling book on International Law (first published in 1977; 6th edition released in 2008). He also edited Title to Territory, a collection of articles on title and sovereignty in international law.

Selected works
Shaw's published writings encompass 20 works in 54 publications in 3 languages and 2,999 library holdings.

 International Law (1977)
 Dispute-settlement in Africa (1983)
 International Law and Intervention in Africa (1985)
 Title to Territory in Africa: International Legal Issues (1986)
 Genocide and International Law (1989)
 The Definition of Minorities in International Law (1991)
 Succession d'états aux biens et aux dettes: opinion à la Commission d'étude des questions afférentes à l'accession du Québec à la souveraineté (1992)
 La dette extérieure (1995)
 The International Court of Justice: a Practical Perspective(1997)
 The Heritage of States: the Principle of "uti possidetis juris" Today (1997)
 Nemzetközi jog (2001)
 Title to Territory (2005)
 The International Law of Territory'' (2008)

Lectures
 The International Legal Principles Relating to Territorial Disputes: The Acquisition of Title to Territory in the Lecture Series of the United Nations Audiovisual Library of International Law
 Settling Territorial Disputes in the Lecture Series of the United Nations Audiovisual Library of International Law
 Principles of Maritime Delimitation in the Lecture Series of the United Nations Audiovisual Library of International Law

References

External links
 University of Leicester staff profile
Essex Court Chambers profile and CV

Living people
1947 births
British legal scholars
British barristers
International law scholars
Academics of the University of Leicester
Alumni of the University of Liverpool
Alumni of Keele University
Members of Gray's Inn
20th-century King's Counsel